Nitai Hershkovits (Hebrew: ניתאי הרשקוביץ) (born 21 February 1988) is an Israeli jazz pianist and composer.

His playing on Cohen's Duende was described by critic John Fordham as "somewhat reminiscent of a silky-toned old piano swinger such as the late Hank Jones". His own album, I Asked You a Question, was a collaboration with Rejoicer, an "Israeli beatmaker". On it, Hershkovits plays piano, Fender Rhodes, synthesizers and clarinet, and adds vocals on two tracks, while Rejoicer plays drums and adds programming.

Discography

Studio albums
 I Asked You a Question (Raw Tapes, 2016)
 New Place Always (Enja, 2018)
 Lemon the Moon (Enja, 2019) 
 Imajin (Raw Tapes, 2022)

Co-Leading 
 Time Grove Ensemble (Raw Tapes, 2021)
 Apifera – Overstand (Stones Throw Records, 2021)
 KerenDun, Nitai Hershkovits – Let The Mountain In (Raw Tapes, 2021)

Featured
 Daniel Zamir – One (8th Note, 2009)
 Ilan Salem – Wild (Razdaz, 2011)
 Avishai Cohen – Duende (EMI/Blue Note Records, 2012)
 Avishai Cohen – Almah (Parlophone/Razdaz, 2013)
 Avi Lebovich Orchestra – Volcano (Indie, 2013)
 Layers – Things on Top of Each Other (Raw Tapes, 2014)
 Avishai Cohen – From Darkness (Razdaz, 2015)
 Daniel Zamir – Redemption Songs (Tzadik, 2015)
 All Original – Best Young Jazz in Israel (Razdaz, 2015)
 Ari Hoenig – Conner's Days (Fresh Sound Records, 2019)
 Oded Tzur – Here Be Dragons (ECM Records, 2020)
 Oded Tzur – Isabela (ECM Records, 2022)

Compilations
 "Flyin' Bamboo (feat. Mndsgn)" – Puzzles, Volume 3 (Raw Tapes, 2018)

References

External links
 

Israeli jazz pianists
1988 births
Living people
21st-century pianists
Enja Records artists